Ghiya Mohamad Mtairek (born 9 January 2000) is a Lebanese footballer who plays as a forward for Lebanese club Super Girls and the Lebanon national team. Mtairek is also a long-distance runner.

Football career 
Mtairek played for Terdeba Stars in the 2018–19 season, scoring four goals. She remained at the club during the 2019–20 season, when they changed their name to Southern Stars; she scored 16 goals. On 1 July 2020, Mtairek joined Super Girls.

Mtairek made her senior international debut for Lebanon on 8 April 2021, coming on as a substitute in a friendly tournament against Armenia.

Running career 
Mtairek is also a long-distance runner. She began running aged 9, at the Beirut Marathon, where she won the 5 km race of her age group. Mtairek participated in all Lebanese championships of her respective age group from 2009 to 2019.

In 2016 Mtairek, who was part of Phoenicia Club Tyre, participated with the Lebanese national team at the 2016 West Asian Junior Athletics Championships in Bahrain, finishing in fourth place in the 400 m women. She participated in the 2017 Limassol Marathon, finishing second in her category and fifth overall in the female 5 km race. Mtairek also participated the following year, finishing third in the female 5 km.

In 2018 Mtairek took part in the Ooredoo Marathon in Qatar, finishing second in the 5 km. In 2019, she won the Lebanese Universities Cross Country representing the Islamic University of Lebanon (IUL). Mtairek finished in second place in the 2019 Limassol Marathon female 5 km.

See also
 List of Lebanon women's international footballers

Notes

References

External links

 
 

2000 births
Living people
People from Tyre, Lebanon
Lebanese women's footballers
Women's association football forwards
Southern Stars Club players
Super Girls FC players
Lebanese Women's Football League players
Lebanon women's international footballers
Lebanese female long-distance runners
Lebanese female cross country runners
Lebanese female sprinters